The 74th Directors Guild of America Awards, honoring the outstanding directorial achievement in feature films, documentary, television and commercials of 2021, were presented on March 12, 2022. The ceremony was hosted by Judd Apatow, who previously hosted the ceremonies in 2018 and 2020. The nominations for the television and documentary categories were announced on January 26, 2022, while the nominations for the feature film categories were announced on January 27, 2022.

Winners and nominees

Film

Television

Commercials

Lifetime Achievement in Feature Film
 Spike Lee

Frank Capra Achievement Award
 Joseph P. Reidy

Franklin J. Schaffner Achievement Award
 Garry W. Hood

References

External links
 

Directors Guild of America Awards
2021 film awards
2021 television awards
2021 in American cinema
2021 in American television
2022 awards in the United States